Basht County is in Kohgiluyeh and Boyer-Ahmad province, Iran. The capital of the county is the city of Basht. At the 2006 census, the region's population (as Basht District of Gachsaran County) was 22,170 in 4,309 households. The following census in 2011 counted 20,699 people in 5,022 households, by which time the district had been separated from the county to form Basht County. At the 2016 census, the county's population was 21,690 in 5,781 households.

Administrative divisions

The population history and structural changes of Basht County's administrative divisions over three consecutive censuses are shown in the following table. The latest census shows two districts, four rural districts, and one city.

References

 

Counties of Kohgiluyeh and Boyer-Ahmad Province